Richard Mayhew (born April 3, 1924) is an Afro-Native American landscape painter, illustrator, and arts educator. His abstract, brightly colored landscapes are informed by his experiences as an African American/Native American and his interest in Jazz and the performing arts. He lives and works in Soquel and Santa Cruz, California.

Life 
Richard Mayhew was born on April 3, 1924, in Amityville, New York, to Native American and African American parents. His father Alvin Mayhew, was of African American and Shinnecock tribe descent and his mother, Lillian Goldman Mayhew was of African American and Cherokee-Lumbee descent. His mother would take him to New York City to see paintings, and he was inspired at a young age by George Inness paintings. As a teenager he studied with medical illustrator James Willson.

He had been in the United States Marines with the Montford Point Marines, rising to the rank of first sergeant during World War II. However, in a 2019 interview, Mayhew expressed he did not identify with his time in military service and it inspired his interest in interdisciplinary studies.

Mayhew studied at the Art Students League of New York and with artist Edwin Dickinson. Later attending Brooklyn Museum Art School in 1948 to 1959, and studying with Reuben Tam. He also took some courses at Columbia University. He worked as a china decorator in the late 1940s in New York, where he met his first wife Dorothy Zuccarini. He was a Jazz singer in the 1950s, performing in small clubs in New York City and in the Borscht Belt in the Catskill Mountains. In 1955 he had his first solo exhibition in Brooklyn, and he ended his singing work.

In 1958, he won the John Hay Whitney Fellowship and took his family with him to Europe. In the 1960s, Mayhew illustrated children's books.

He was a founding member of Spiral, a black painters' group in the 1960s in New York that included Romare Bearden, Charles Alston, Charles White, Felrath Hines, Norman Lewis, Emma Amos, Reginald Gammon, and Hale Woodruff as members. The Spiral collective formed in 1963, after the March on Washington for Jobs and Freedom, as a way for artists to discuss their experiences in the Civil Rights movement. He was also a member of the Black Emergency Cultural Coalition.

For 14 years he taught at Pennsylvania State University, starting in 1977 and retiring in 1991. He taught art and/or interdisciplinary thinking at other schools around the United States, including Brooklyn Museum Art School (1963), Pratt Institute (1963), Art Students League of New York (1965), Smith College (1969), Hunter College (1971), California State University, East Bay (1974), San Jose State University (1975), Sonoma State University (1976), University of California, Santa Cruz (1992), and others. He was introduced to interdisciplinary learning during his time teaching at Pratt which at the time offered different disciplines alongside art studio, and he was working alongside other instructors such as Eleanor Holmes Norton (teaching sociology), Jacob Lawrence, and William A.J. Payne (teaching anthropology). Students of Mayhew include Beverly McIver, Rodney Allen Trice, among others.

In 2000, Mayhew moved to Soquel in Santa Cruz County, California.

A solo retrospective exhibition of Mayhew's work took place in 2009 in New York City at ZONE: Contemporary Art at 41 West 57th Street The exhibition traveled to three additional venues.

Mayhew's work is featured in various permanent collections including: San Francisco Museum of Modern Art (SFMoMA), De Young (museum), Metropolitan Museum of Art, Whitney Museum of American Art, and the Smithsonian Institution, among others.

Personal life 
He was married to artist Dorothy Zuccarini and together they had two children, Ina Mayhew and Scott Mayhew. His second marriage was to Rosemary Gibbons.

Filmography

See also 
List of African-American visual artists

References

Further reading

External links 

 Richard Mayhew profile on Spark KQED
 

American landscape painters
African-American painters
1924 births
Living people
American people of Native American descent
People from Amityville, New York
People from Santa Cruz County, California
Pennsylvania State University faculty
Abstract expressionist artists
Landscape painters
United States Marine Corps non-commissioned officers
African Americans in World War II
People from Soquel, California
Art Students League of New York faculty
Art Students League of New York people
Pratt Institute faculty
Brooklyn Museum Art School alumni
United States Marine Corps personnel of World War II
21st-century African-American people
Art Students League of New York alumni
Columbia University alumni
African-American United States Navy personnel